Pallacanestro Trapani, known for sponsorship reasons as 2B Control Trapani, is an Italian professional basketball team that is based in Trapani, Sicily. The club's full name is Club Sportivo Pallacanestro Trapani. The club plays in the second division Serie A2, as of the 2015-16 season.

Season by season 
Note: Statistics are correct as of 8 October 2020.

Arena

The club played in the Palestra "Dante Alighieri" (capacity:300) from 1970 to 1982 and the Palestra "Tenente Alberti" (capacity:800) from 1982 to 1986.

After spending the 1986-87 season in the Marsala based Palasport "Fortunato Bellina" (capacity:600), the side moved back to Trapani in the Palasport "Palagranata" (capacity:3,800) where it stayed until 1997.

Since then Trapani has played in the 4,575 seater PalaIlio. In August 2015, its name became the Pala Conad for sponsorship reasons.

Current roster

Notable players

Retired numbers

Other notable players

Head coaches

Alberto Cardella 1967–68
Giuseppe Vento 1968–73
Franco Di Paola 1973–75
Leonardo Mione 1975–77
Antonino Fodale 1977–1978
Leonardo Mione 1978–79
Alberto Cardella 1979–80
Rino Monaco 1980–81?
Giuseppe Barbara 1980–81?
Piero Musumeci 1981–82?
Antonino Fodale 1981–82?
Emilio Trivelli 1982–84
Bruno Boero 1984–86
Stefano Michelini 1986–88
Gianfranco Benvenuti 1988–91
Giancarlo Sacco 1991–92
Riccardo Sales 1992–93
Giovanni Gebbia 1993–94 (Oct.)
Giancarlo Sacco 1993 (Nov.)–94
Gianfranco Benvenuti -1994 (October)
Riccardo Cantone 1994 (Oct.)–95 (Jan.)
Giuseppe Barbara 1995 (Jan.) -
Giovanni Papini 1995–96 (Feb.)
Stefano Cardella 1995–96 (Feb.)
Marco Morganti 1996–97
Paolo Mollura 1997–98
Giacomo Genovese 1998–99 (Dec.)
Gianni Lambruschi 2000 (Jan.) -
Marco Morganti 2001 (Jan.) - 
Gianni Montemurro 2001–02
Massimo Bernardi 2002–03
Tony Trullo 2003–04
Luca Banchi 2004–05
Luigi Gresta -2005 (Nov.)
Giancarlo Sacco -2005 (Nov.)–06
Gianluca Tucci 2006–08
Marco Calvani 2008–09 (Mar.)
Marcello Perazzetti 09 (Mar.) -
Giovanni Benedetto 2009–11
Flavio Priulla 2011–13
Lino Lardo 2013–15
Ugo Ducarello 2015-18
Daniele Parente 2018-present

Presidents
 Francesco Calamia (1964–69)
 Giovanni Denaro (1969–80)
 Giovanni Crimi (1980–81)
 Vincenzo Garraffa (1981–94)
 Francesco Osvaldo Todaro (1994–97)   
 Andrea Magaddino (1997-09)
 Alessandro Massinelli (2009–11)
 Pietro Basciano (2011–Present)

Sponsorship names
Throughout the years, due to sponsorship, the club has been known as:

 Pasta Poiatti Trapani (1984–1986)
 Olio Caruso Trapani (1986–1988)
 Pallacanestro Trapani (1988–1989)
 Vini Racine Trapani (1989–1990)
 Birra Messina Trapani (1990–1991)
 L'altra Sicilia Trapani (1991–1992)
 Tonno Auriga Trapani (1992–1996)
 Pallacanestro Trapani (1996–1998)
 Banca del Popolo Trapani (1998–1999)
 Banca Popolare Sant'Angelo Trapani (1999-2001)
 Basket Trapani (2001–2002)
 Satin Trapani (2002–2003)
 Basket Trapani (2003–2004)
 Banca Nuova Trapani (2004–2009)
 Basket Trapani (2009–2010)
 Shinelco Trapani (2010–2011)
 Gestamp Solar Trapani (2011–2012)
 Lighthouse Trapani (2012–2015)
 Lighthouse Conad Trapani (2015–2016)
 Lighthouse Trapani (2016-2018)
 2B Control Trapani (2018–present)

References

External links
Official website 
Serie A historical results  Retrieved 24 August 2015
Eurobasket.com profile

1964 establishments in Italy
Basketball teams established in 1964
Basketball teams in Sicily